Kankelibranchus is a genus of sea slugs, specifically nudibranchs, shell-less marine gastropod molluscs in the family Polyceridae.

Species 
Species in the genus Kankelibranchus include:

References

Polyceridae